Brian Blears was a footballer who played as a wing half in the Football League for Chester.

References

1933 births
2005 deaths
People from Prestatyn
Sportspeople from Denbighshire
Association football wing halves
Welsh footballers
Everton F.C. players
Chester City F.C. players
Northwich Victoria F.C. players
English Football League players